Radio Tamaulipas is the state radio network of Tamaulipas, originating from studios in the capital of Ciudad Victoria and airing on seven FM and three AM transmitters in the state.

Transmitters

Former transmitters

Two further transmitters no longer have valid permits:

References

Radio stations in Ciudad Victoria
Radio stations in Ciudad Mante
Radio stations in Nuevo Laredo
Public radio in Mexico
Radio stations in Matamoros, Tamaulipas
Radio stations in Tampico